Spivak or Spivack is a surname of Ukrainian language-origin, meaning singer. It is also common among Ukrainian Jews, in which case it refers to cantor. The name may refer to:

Charlie Spivak (1907–1982), American trumpeter and bandleader
David Spivak (born 1978), American mathematician
 Elye Spivak (1890–1950), Soviet linguist
Gayatri Chakravorty Spivak (born 1942), Indian literary critic and professor at Columbia University
Gordon Spivack (1928–2000), American antitrust lawyer and Justice Department official
John L. Spivak (1897–1981), American communist reporter and author
 Lawrence Spivak (1900–1994), American journalist and publisher
Lori Spivak (contemporary), Canadian jurist from Manitoba
Marla Spivak (born 1955), American entomologist and winner of the MacArthur Fellowship
Maryana Spivak (born 1985), Russian actress
Michael D. Spivak (1940–2020), American mathematician and author
Mira Spivak (born 1934), Canadian politician from Manitoba; member of the Canadian Senate
Nissan Spivak (1824–1906), Bessarabian cantor and composer
Nova Spivack (born 1969), American internet entrepreneur
Oleksandr Spivak (born 1975), Russian-Ukrainian football player of the FC Zenit Saint Petersburg football club
Sidney Spivak (1928–2002), Canadian politician from Manitoba

Film 
 Spivak (film), a 2018 American film starring Michael Bacall and Maggie Lawson

See also
 
 Spivak pronoun, a gender-neutral pronoun named after Michael Spivak
 Śpiewak, Polish surname

References

Slavic-language surnames
Ukrainian-language surnames
Jewish surnames
Occupational surnames